Shib Kalayeh (also Romanized as Shʿīb Kalāyeh; also known as Sīb Kalāyeh) is a village in Goli Jan Rural District, in the Central District of Tonekabon County, Mazandaran Province, Iran. At the 2006 census, its population was 291, in 84 families.

References 

Populated places in Tonekabon County